Merizocera picturata, is a species of spiders of the family Psilodercidae. It is endemic to Sri Lanka.

See also
 List of Psilodercidae species

References

Psilodercidae
Spiders of Asia
Arthropods of Sri Lanka
Endemic fauna of Sri Lanka
Spiders described in 1893
Taxa named by Eugène Simon